Whit Hertford (born on November 2, 1978) is an American theatre director, writer, and actor.

Film and television 
His film career spans three decades and began at an early age, most notably with his appearance in Steven Spielberg's Jurassic Park. In 2009 and 2010 he recurred as "Officer / Detective Ross" on the FOX comedy Raising Hope and as the tyrannical rival choreographer Dakota Stanley during the first season of Glee. Other TV credits include Psych, various appearances on Conan and as the voice of Cadet Kryze on Star Wars: The Clone Wars.

In 2009 he co-founded the independent film company Sneak Attack with director Ryan Darst. Their American New Wave short and full-length films (written by Hertford) have screened at festivals in the US and Europe, including the premiere of the revenge film Wildlife at Cannes Film Festival (2015) in the "Short Film Corner" which is not affiliated with the Festival de Cannes Official Short Film Competition, or the main Cannes Film Festival. The "Short Film Corner" film market screens all entries that pay the required entry fee. The production shot all on location in rural Utah and co-stars Jon Heder, Lauren Lapkus and is scored by Joshua James.

In 2014 he received Best Actor awards for his work as geneticist Jesse Darden in the science fiction independent feature film The Perfect 46 from the Other Worlds Film Festival in Austin, Texas and Filmquest Film Festival in Salt Lake City, Utah.

In 2015, he portrayed Charles Manson in the coming of age 1960s era thriller Prettyface.

Theatre
He received an MFA in theatre directing from The University of Essex's East 15 in London. He also studied in Moscow at the Russian Academy of Theatre Arts (GITIS).

He is the artistic director of the theatre company Riot Act, founded in the UK in 2015.

He was an Associate Director at Theatre N16 in South London. He is a member of the Young Vic Directors Programme and was an invitee director of Toneelgroep Amsterdam.

Directing credits include his adaptations include: Bad Person (Platonov), Mopey Wrecks (Three Sisters), Poor Bastard (Ivanov) and The Misbegotten Hope of the Dirty Bird* (The Seagull). His Shakespearean adaptations include: Høüses, an immersive LGBTQA version of Romeo and Juliet, and Dóttir* - a tragedy that explores seven of Shakespeare's motherless daughter archetypes. Additionally, he directed the US regional premiere of Annie Baker's The Aliens, the 2016 critically acclaimed contemporary production of Henrik Ibsen's The League of Youth (in only its third UK production since publication in 1870) and a London fringe run of Coverage, a newsroom retelling of Julius Caesar - both by Canadian playwright Ashley Pearson. Other directing credits include the debuts of his original plays: Lunatic, a nü gothic psychological thriller based on Bram Stoker's Dracula, Anatomy of Arithmetic*, Bloke and Hero & Leander - adapted from Christopher Marlowe.

He has directed at the Arcola Theatre and Southwark Playhouse in London. He served as an Associate Director at The Courtyard Theatre, in Hoxton East London where he was artistic director of Versions, a month long festival of classical adaptations and devised theatre in commemoration of the 400th anniversary of Shakespeare.

His other plays include: Post Modern, Science Fiction, The Heimrich Maneuver, Endangered Species, The Space Program, Stockholm Syndrome, Future Generations, Travel Guide to Wherever, Hateful Deeds (a restructuring of Richard III) and his other Chekhovian adaptations, Rotten Fruit (The Cherry Orchard) and Gross Old Man (Uncle Vanya).

From 2005 to 2011, Hertford was a member of the Upright Citizens Brigade in Los Angeles as a sketch writer, performer and improviser.

On stage he has also performed in the following productions:  The Aliens (regional premiere - KJ), Three Sisters (Solyony), Ibsen's An Enemy of the People (Aslaksen), True West (Austin) A Midsummer Night's Dream (Bottom), Twelfth Night (Malvolio), The Tempest (Caliban), Measure for Measure (Lucio), Hamlet (Gravedigger).

He holds a BFA from the Actor Training Program at the University of Utah.

Personal
Whit Hertford is also as an abstract painter.

Directing credits
2022
 Blindness and Periphery of Sight by Whit Hertford based on Sophocles Oedipus trilogy, Frogtown Studios, East Los Angeles (US).
 Lés Maids in a new translation by Whit Hertford after Jean Genet, Frogtown Studios, East Los Angeles (US)(*workshops).
 Bad Person by Whit Hertford adapted from Platonov after Chekhov, Studio/Stage, Los Angeles (US).
2019
 Anatomy of Arithmetic by Whit Hertford, Ember SLC (US)
2018
 Mopey Wrecks - an adaptation of Three Sisters by Whit Hertford after Anton Chekhov, Ember SLC (US)
 The Aliens - by Annie Baker, Ember SLC, (US)

2017
 An Enemy of the People - by Whit Hertford after Henrik Ibsen, CUAC Art Gallery, (US)
 Høüses - an LGBTQ modern reimagining of Romeo and Juliet (adapted), Kilby Court, (US)
 Poor Bastard an adaptation of Ivanov by Whit Hertford after Anton Chekhov, CUAC Art Gallery, (US)

2016
 Lunatic by Whit Hertford, based on Bram Stoker's Dracula, Theatre N16, Balham South London
 The Sting by Suzette Coon (co-dir), Southwark Playhouse, South London
 The League of Youth by Ashley Pearson after Henrik Ibsen, Theatre N16, Balham South London
 Anatomy of Arithmetic by Whit Hertford, The Courtyard Theatre, Hoxton East London
 Coverage a new version of Julius Caesar by Ashley Pearson, The Courtyard Theatre, Hoxton East London
 Dóttir by Whit Hertford, The Courtyard Theatre, Hoxton East London

2015
 The Misbegotten Hope of the Dirty Bird an adaptation of The Seagull by Whit Hertford after Anton Chekhov, The Courtyard Theatre, Hoxton East London
 Bloke by Whit Hertford, East 15, Essex UK
 Hero + Leander by Whit Hertford adapted from the poem by Christopher Marlowe, East 15, Essex UK
 13 by Mike Bartlett (asst. dir.), East 15, Essex UK
 Bricks and Bones by Hannah Roger (co-dir.), Arcola Theatre, East London
 Holy, Holy, Shadow devised by The Stage Standard + Concierge Theatre, London, UK

Additional directing credits:
 Fool For Love by Sam Shepard, The Stage Standard, Salt Lake City, UT
 Bright Ideas by Eric Coble, University of Utah (regional debut)
 Twelfth Night by Wm. Shakespeare (asst. dir), Salt Lake Shakespeare, Salt Lake City, UT

Filmography

 Lay It Down (1985, Video short) .... Child at birthday party(young Steven Pearcy) 
 The Twilight Zone (1985, TV Series) .... Young Boy
 Second Serve (1986, TV Movie) .... Richard / Renee as a child
 Poltergeist II: The Other Side (1986) .... Kane's People
 In Self Defense (1987, TV Movie) .... Evan
 Home Fires (1987, TV Movie) .... Will Ash
 Rampage (1987) .... Andrew Tippetts
 Cagney & Lacey (1988, TV Series) .... Bobby Gorvel
 Side By Side (1988, TV Movie) .... Newsboy
 Family Man (1988, TV Series) .... Josh Tobin
 Beaches (1988) .... Tom (uncredited)
 A Nightmare on Elm Street 5: The Dream Child (1989) .... Jacob Johnson
 Empty Nest (1989-1991, TV Series) .... Timmy / Alec
 Mr. Belvedere (1989-1990, TV Series) .... James Montgomery
 McGee and Me! (1989-1993, Direct-to-video series) .... Phillip Monroe Jr.
 Full House (1989-1990, TV Series) .... Walter "Duckface" Berman
 The Munsters Today (1990, TV Series) .... Kid Grandpa
 Taking Care of Business (1990) .... Yuppie Son
 Midnight Patrol: Adventures in the Dream Zone (1990, TV Series) .... Nick
 Fox's Peter Pan & the Pirates (1990-1991, TV Series) .... Michael Darling (voice)
 Talespin (1990-1991, TV Series) .... Ernie (voice)
 Tiny Toon Adventures (1990–1992, TV Series) .... Duncan Duff / Flio (voice)
 The Addams Family (1991) .... Little Tully
 Mikey (1992) .... Ben Owens
 The Little Mermaid (1992–1994, TV Series) .... Ollie / Rex / Crabscout (voice)
 Civil Wars (1993, TV Series) .... Boy
 Jurassic Park (1993) .... Volunteer Boy
 2 Stupid Dogs (1993, TV Series) .... Buzz (voice)
 Batman: The Animated Series (1994, TV Series) .... Billy the Seal Boy* (voice)
 My Summer Story (1994) .... Lug Ditka
 The Ben Stiller Show (1995, TV Series) .... Kreepee Kid
 The Land Before Time III: The Time of the Great Giving (1995) .... Hyp (speaking voice)
 Capitol Critters (1995, TV Series) .... (voice)
 Minor Adjustments (1996, TV Series) .... Rocky Delmond
 Mousehunt (1997) .... Vinnie (uncredited)
 MADtv (2000, TV Series) .... Billy
 The Pink Conspiracy (2007) .... Nursey
 Moving McAllister (2007) .... Fast-Food Cashier
 Break (2008) .... The Lawyer
 Dark Reel (2008) .... Chef
 Gerald (2008) .... Funeral Director
 Chowder (2009, TV Series) .... Customer / Satisfied Customer / Behind the Scene Friend #1 (voice)
 Glee (2009, TV Series) .... Dakota Stanley
 How I Met Your Mother (2009, TV Series) .... Lost in Space Robot
 The Tonight Show with Conan O'Brien (2010, TV Series) .... Passenger / Fluffer Guy / Mad Max Warrior
 Long Story Short (2010, also writer, producer) .... Fisher
 Gerald (2010) .... Funeral Home Director
 Star Wars: The Clone Wars (2010-2013, TV Series) .... Korkie Kryze / Mandalorian Super Commando / Cadet Korkie (voice)
 Glory Daze (2011, TV Series) .... Leprechaun
 Hit List (2011) .... Phil
 Psych (2011, TV Series) .... Donald
 Elliott (2011, Short, also co-writer, producer) .... Graham
 MAD (2011-2012, TV Series) .... Snott Pilgrim (voice)
 Raising Hope (2011-2013, TV Series) .... Officer Ross
 Dreamworld (2012, Short, also co-writer, producer) .... Oliver Hayes
 Peter at The End (2012, also co-writer, associate producer) .... Harrison
 Tomorrow (2012, Short, also writer, producer) .... Miles
 The Caper Kind (2013, Short, also co-writer, producer, co-director) .... Rascal Woods
 The Perfect 46 (2014, also producer) .... Jesse Darden
 Wildlife (2014, also writer, producer) .... Possum Mutz
 Midway (2013, also co-writer, producer) .... Otis Alabaster
 Prettyface (2016, Short) .... Charlie Manson
 Clean Blood (2018, Short)
 Hateful Deeds (2018, also writer, director)

References

External links

Living people
20th-century American male actors
21st-century American male actors
American male film actors
American male child actors
American male television actors
University of Utah alumni
1978 births